In music, Op. 103 stands for Opus number 103. Compositions that are assigned this number include:

 Beethoven – Octet
 Prokofiev – Piano Sonata No. 9
 Saint-Saëns – Piano Concerto No. 5
 Schumann – Mädchenlieder (2 women's voices and piano)
 Shostakovich – Symphony No. 11